Gerald Gay (born July 22, 1956) is an American politician and a former Republican member of the  Wyoming House of Representatives representing District 36. Gay previously served non-consecutively from 2001 until 2003 and from 2005 until 2007. Based on an interview given to the organization Better Wyoming, Gay doesn't believe the gender wage gap exists.

Early life
Gay was born in Casper, Wyoming. He earned his AS in physical science from Casper College and his BS in chemical engineering from the University of Wyoming.

Elections
2012 Gay was unopposed for both the August 21, 2012 Republican Primary, winning with 734 votes, and the November 6, 2012 General election, winning with 2,802 votes.
2000 When Democratic Representative Deborah Fleming left the Legislature and left the District 36 seat open, Gay was unopposed for the August 22, 2000 Republican Primary, winning with 845 votes, and won the November 7, 2000 General election with 1,798 votes (51.8%) against Democratic nominee Liz Gentile.
2002 Gay was challenged in the August 20, 2002 Republican Primary and lost to former Representative Bob Tanner; Tanner lost the November 5, 2002 General election to Democratic nominee Liz Gentile by a single vote, following a recount.
2004 Gay and Representative Gentile were both unopposed for their August 17, 2004 primaries, setting up the rematch which had been averted by Gay's 2002 primary loss; Gay won the November 2, 2004 General election with 1,992 votes (52.2%) against Representative Gentile.
2006 Gay and Gentile were both unopposed for the August 22, 2006 primaries, setting up their third contest; Gay lost the November 7, 2006 General election to Gentile, who left the Legislature after the term.
2010 To challenge incumbent Democratic Representative Mary Hales, Gay won the August 17, 2010 Republican Primary with 742 votes (58.8%), and won the November 2, 2010 General election with 1,500 votes (56.8%) against Representative Hales.

Questioning Governor Mead

References

External links
 Official page at the Wyoming Legislature
 

1956 births
Living people
Casper College alumni
Republican Party members of the Wyoming House of Representatives
Politicians from Casper, Wyoming
University of Wyoming alumni
21st-century American politicians